Islam Nagar is a neighbourhood in the Karachi West district of Karachi, Pakistan, that previously was a part of Baldia Town until 2011.

There are several ethnic groups including Muhajirs, Sindhis, Kashmiris, Seraikis, Pakhtuns, Balochis, Brahuis,
Memons, Bohras Ismailis, etc.

Union Council No. 1 of Baldia Town contains three Mohallas i.e.Gulshan-e-Ghazi, Islamnagar and Abidabad. Awans are in majority in Islamnagar and other communities like people from Mianwali and Hazarewals, Pakhtuns, Punjabis, Seraikis, etc. Islamnagar is the smallest Mohalla of UC-1.  Islamnagar is very important by geographical conditions. It is a pathway from Hub Industrial Area to Orangi Town and followed by Nazimabad and North Karachi.

See also 
 Islamnagar, Badaun
 Islamnagar, Lahore

References

External links
 Karachi Website .

Neighbourhoods of Karachi
Baldia Town